Dino Pompanin (18 March 1930 – 31 December 2015) was an Italian alpine skier. He competed in the men's giant slalom at the 1956 Winter Olympics.

References

External links
 

1930 births
2015 deaths
Italian male alpine skiers
Olympic alpine skiers of Italy
Alpine skiers at the 1956 Winter Olympics
People from Cortina d'Ampezzo
Sportspeople from the Province of Belluno